Laetatus sum (I am glad), is a musical setting of Psalm 122 (Psalm 121 in the Vulgate) in Latin by Jules Van Nuffel, composed in 1935 for mixed choir and organ.

History 

Van Nuffel set many Latin texts to music, including ten psalms, for the liturgy and also concert at the Sint Rombouts Kathedraal in Mechelen, where he served as cantor, while Flor Peeters was organist. In the Latin Psalters the psalms are numbered differently. Psalm 121 there is Psalm 122 in the King James Bible. Van Nuffel set the psalm in April 1935 for a mixed four-part choir and organ.

The psalm was published by the Schwann Verlag (now part of Edition Peters), which published also other works of the composer.

Words and music 

The psalm in nine verses is one of 15 Songs of Ascents. It deals with the expectation to go to the house of the Lord in Jerusalem together with other pilgrims, expanding what Jerusalem means to them. The last four verses invite to prayer for the peace, security and prosperity for Jerusalem. Van Nuffel set the Latin text in one movement of different moods:

The music in F minor and  time is marked Con moto (with movement), initially marked mezzo-forte. Soprano and alto begin "Laetatus sum" together with an ascending motif, which tenor and bass pick up the following measure in the opposite direction, and intensified by the organ in the third measure. "Illuc enim ascenderunt" begins slightly slower (poco allargando) in the basses, again with ascending motifs. The other voices join in vivid movement. The last psalm verse, "Propter bonum", prepared by a strong crescendo and ritardando, is rendered in calmer, majestic singing, accented by rising chords in the organ. The psalm is concluded by a repeat of the first verse, ending extremely softly on a repeated "Jerusalem".

Recordings 

Another recording of this psalm appears on Psalms – Te Deum at the Sint-Rombouts Cathedral, Malines, a René Gailly CD (87 059), performed by the choir of the Sint Rombouts Cathedral and two other choirs, conducted by Johan Van Bouwelen, with organist Peter Pieters and the brass ensemble "The Art of Brass".

References

External links 
 
 Parallel Latin/English Psaltern / Psalmus 121 (122) medievalist.net

Choral compositions
Psalm settings
1935 compositions